Marouan Azarkan (born 8 December 2001) is a Dutch professional footballer who plays as a forward for Excelsior, on loan from Feyenoord.

Club career
On 2 May 2019, Azarkan signed his first professional contract with Feyenoord. He made his professional debut with Feyenoord in a 3–2 Eredivisie win over ADO Den Haag on 15 September 2019. On 10 August 2020, Feyenoord announced that the club had reached an agreement with Azarkan to extend his contract until the end of the 2022–23 season.

Azarkan was sent on a one-season loan to Excelsior on 9 August 2021. On 5 July 2022, following Excelsior's promotion to the Eredivisie, his loan was renewed for the 2022–23 season.

International career
Born in the Netherlands, Azarkan is of Moroccan descent. He is a youth international for the Netherlands.

References

External links
 
 Ons Oranje U16 Profile
 Ons Oranje U18 Profile
 Ons Oranje U19 Profile

2001 births
Living people
Footballers from Rotterdam
Association football forwards
Dutch footballers
Netherlands youth international footballers
Dutch sportspeople of Moroccan descent
Feyenoord players
NAC Breda players
Excelsior Rotterdam players
Eredivisie players
Eerste Divisie players